The Eastern Grassfields languages, spoken in the Western High Plateau of Cameroon, are a branch of the Grassfields languages including Bamun, Yamba and Bamileke.

There are four or five branches to the family: 
 Nkambe languages (north)
 Mbam–Nkam
 Ngemba languages
 Bamileke languages
 Nun languages

Nurse (2003) reports that Bamileke might be two branches.

References

 
Languages of Cameroon
Grassfields Bantu languages